Hygene Atoms is an alternative hip hop and electronica album by the New Pollutants (Mister Speed and DJ Tr!p), also known as Benjamin Speed and Tyson Hopprich. This is the band's debut album.

Track listing

 "New Pollutant Rumours" – 0:35
 "Sign Code (New Pollutants Manifesto Parts 1-4)" – 5:12
 "The Muse" – 3:33
 "Mathematical 1" – 1:11
 "How Big Birds Got Their Colours" – 2:29
 "The New Pollutants Theme Song (feat. Mecca)" – 4:26
 "Turbo" – 1:46
 "Online Celebrity (hyphenated.mod)" – 3:45
 "Ghouls And Ghosts" – 3:54
 "It's All My Fault" – 2:22
 "Dream" – 4:37
 "Become Flesh (New Pollutants Manifesto Parts 5-8)" – 4:28
 "Paperback Horror" – 0:26
 "Sign Code (Discogreen Remix)!" – 3:09
 "Abducting (with Stickyfingers & Mecca)!" – 30:57

A 'secret track' at the end of the album is a news article about an exploding whale.

2002 debut albums